Admiral Makarov is an  of the Russian Navy, part of the Black Sea Fleet based at Sevastopol. She was laid down at the Yantar Shipyard in February 2012 and commissioned on 25 December 2017. She is the most recently built of her class, and the third of six ships that had been planned in the class .

Service
In July 2018, the frigate took part in Russia's Main Naval Parade in St. Petersburg.

On 18 August 2018, Admiral Makarov set sail from the Baltic Sea for the Black Sea and sailed through the English Channel on 21 August. After shadowing the British supercarrier, Admiral Makarov arrived at her permanent base in occupied Sevastopol in early October.

On 5 November 2018, the press service of the Russian Navy's Black Sea Fleet announced the frigate had left Sevastopol to join the Russian naval group in the eastern Mediterranean.

2022 Russian invasion of Ukraine
In 2022, Admiral Makarov—along with —took part in the Russian invasion of Ukraine, targeting a Ukrainian oil refinery and fuel depots in the suburbs of Odesa with cruise missiles.

Following the 14 April 2022 sinking of the cruiser Moskva, Admiral Makarov assumed the role of flagship of the Black Sea Fleet.

On 6 May 2022, Ukrainian MP Oleksiy Honcharenko claimed that Admiral Makarov had been struck and badly damaged by a Ukrainian missile. On 9 May, Admiral Makarov was spotted sailing intact near Sevastopol.

On 29 October 2022, Admiral Makarov suffered damage during an attack on Sevastopol by several air and sea drones with at least one sea drone striking the ship during the attack, reportedly disabling the radar. Russian news agency TASS reported that all the air drones had been destroyed. Satellite footage from 1 November show Admiral Grigorovich-class frigates believed to include Admiral Makarov moored in Sevastopol.
Naval News subsequently reported that little damage had occurred to either of the two warships that were hit by the sea drones, but that the military effect of the attack on the protected harbor of Sevastopol exceeded the direct damage because it led to the Russian Navy going into a protective mode, "essentially locking them in port. ... New defenses were quickly added, new procedures imposed and there was much less activity. Russia’s most powerful warships in the war [were by mid-November] mostly tied up in port."

References

External links
A Russian Warship Causes Concern on the HMS Queen Elizabeth

2015 ships
Admiral Grigorovich-class frigates
Frigates of the Russian Navy
Ships built at Yantar Shipyard
Ships involved in the 2022 Russian invasion of Ukraine
Maritime incidents in 2022
Southern Ukraine campaign